David McCarthy (born July 11, 1981) is a civil engineer, urban hydrologist, and an academic. He is an Associate Professor in the Civil Engineering Department at Queensland University of Technology. He is the founder of the Environmental and Public Health Microbiology Laboratory (EPHM Lab) and the BoSL Water Monitoring and Control lab, both at Monash University. His research interests span the field of integrated water management, with a particular focus on urban hydrology, stormwater harvesting and reuse, and green water technologies.

McCarthy is a Churchill Fellow, FASIC Fellow, and a Victoria Fellow. He is an Editor of Water Research.

Education
McCarthy earned a BSc in mathematics and physics in 2004, and a Bachelor of Engineering in Civil Engineering in 2005 from Monash University. He undertook postgraduate research in the Civil Engineering Department there from 2005 and completed his PhD in 2009. His PhD thesis was titled "Modeling microorganisms in urban stormwater".

Career
Following his PhD, McCarthy started his academic career as a Lecturer in the Civil Engineering Department at Monash University in 2010. Later, in 2013, he was appointed Senior Lecturer, a position he held for two years. Since 2016, he has been serving as an Associate Professor in Water Engineering in the Civil Engineering Department at Monash University. In 2023, he moved to Queensland University of Technology. 

He was a Project Leader at the CRC for Water Sensitive Cities, where he researched passive treatment technologies to efficiently remove micropollutants and pathogens from various water sources.

Research
McCarthy has authored numerous publications, including articles in journals and book chapters. He is most known for his research in the fields of urban hydrology, stormwater management, sensor networks, and wastewater treatment and is the recipient of many awards. He developed the first model for predicting microorganism concentrations in urban stormwater. His research is focused on the treatment of storm and wastewaters by investigating the pollutants’ movement within urban water systems and removing micropollutants and pathogens for the protection of downstream ecosystems and human health.

Integrated water management
During his PhD work, McCarthy carried out the collection and uncertainty analysis of urban stormwater microorganism datasets and started the development of a model that predicts microbes in urban stormwater. Later, his largest urban stormwater microorganism dataset in Australia also contributed to the formulation of Australian Guidelines for Water Recycling: Stormwater Harvesting and Reuse. He helped establish the first system that can treat urban stormwater runoff to an acceptable standard for reuse without pre- or post-treatment, the enviss system.

While investigating urban drainage quality and quantity modeling, McCarthy assessed and characterized the techniques that are used in the uncertainty assessment of the parameters of water models. Later, he presented a review of integrated urban water modeling, formulated a new typology for the classification of integrated models, and also addressed the fundamental model features. He also put forth the process-based MPiRe model (Micro-Pollutants In RaingardEns - quality model) with a team of researchers in order to remove a variety of micro-pollutants from stormwater using biofilters.

Wastewater surveillance
Focusing the research on wastewater-based surveillance during the COVID-19 pandemic, McCarthy developed a cheap and deployable sampler unit for the detection of SARS-CoV-2, and other wastewater-based epidemiology (WBE). He collaborated with UoG researchers Larry Goodridge, Ed McBean, Heather Murphy and March Habash, who used his device to monitor wastewater at UoG residences and at the Guelph Wastewater Facility (GWF). Additionally, he has carried out environmental monitoring of microbiological hazards in two countries in the Asia-Pacific region, including Fiji and Indonesia.

Low-cost sensors
With a team of researchers, he proposed an inexpensive, and low-power sensor for discharge detection that can be deployed in the urban drainage network for high-resolution data monitoring against high-end loggers and sensors. They developed new sensors, loggers, and AI anomaly detection algorithms and applied them to a smart sensor array that could detect illicit connections that introduced pathogens into Australian drinking water supplies and recreational waterways. Using these sensor networks, his research team has detected multiple incursions of sewage into Australian waterways.

Biofiltration and urban hydrology
McCarthy has conducted research on sustainable stormwater management, with a particular focus on biofiltration. He has conducted research aimed at tackling pollution, and treating stormwater to ensure its safety for both reuse, and discharge in the downstream ecosystem and water bodies. According to his research, biofiltration is a highly efficient method for removing pollutants from urban stormwater, including pathogens, heavy metals, nitrogen, and phosphorus. Moreover, it was highlighted that the choice of design has a significant impact on the biofilters’ removal potential. His research has illustrated that biofilters tend to be resilient despite operation condition variations, and indicate a satisfactory removal of metals for stormwater harvesting. He has also focused much of his research on examining the retention and survival of E. coli in stormwater biofilters. Exploring the inconsistent removal of faecal microorganisms with biofilters, his research studies looked into the antimicrobial potential of a variety of Australian native plant species. It concluded that myrtaceous plants, such as Melaleuca fulgens, and Melaleuca ericifolia are effective at inactivating microbial pathogens and should be used in stormwater treatment facilities, particularly in biofilters. In addition to that, he has contributed to the development of photocatalytic heterojunctions by achieving optimal activity of TiO2 coupled with WO3 in order to use their superior photoactivity for water disinfection. He conducted research on the use of biofilters as an effective pathogen remover for the reuse of greywater, and determined a mixture of coir and perlite media as the best choice to be used in green walls for greywater reuse systems.
 
McCarthy's research study from 2020 provided the first evidence that real-time control (RTC) of stormwater biofilters can reduce the effects of operational characteristics like long dry spells and high inflow volumes that lead to inadequate treatment of faecal microbes.

Microbial source tracking
McCarthy’s team has focused on the development of new tools to allow for more sensitive and specific source tracking techniques using high throughput sequencing approaches. His work proposed the use of 16s amplicon sequencing datasets for microbial source tracking, and was the first to attempt to validate these results using a modelling technique.

Waterborne disease risks to recreational users of Victorian waterways
Some of McCarthy's research focuses on the bio surveillance of waterborne pathogens and the public health risks of swimming in beaches, estuaries, and rivers. He developed modelling and tracking tools to warn users more quickly (within a few hours vs 24 hours), and to track and remedy pollution. He was an invited science advisor for the review of the 2016–2017 State Environment Protection Policy for recreational risks of Victorian Waters. This culminated in the Victorian EPA to issue the report based on his studies.

Awards and honors
2009 – Stormwater Industry Association Award, Storm Water Industry Association
2009-2010 – Winston Churchill Fellowship, International Churchill Society
2012 – FASIC Fellowship, Australian Academy of Science
2014 – Dean's Award for an Early Career Researcher, Monash University
2014 – Civil Engineering Awarded for an Early Career Researcher, Monash University
2014 – Young Tall Poppy Science Award, Australian Institute of Policy and Science (AIPS)
2014 – Victoria Fellow, Victoria State Government
2014 – Early Career Alumni for the faculty of Engineering, Monash University
2014 –Trevithick Prize, Institution of Civil Engineers (ICE)
2021 – Dean’s Award for Research Enterprise, Monash University
2021 – Dean’s Award for Research Impact, Monash University
2021 – Vice Chancellors Award for Research Impact, Monash University

Selected articles
Schang, C., Crosbie, N. D., Nolan, M., Poon, R., Wang, M., Jex, A., ... & McCarthy, D. T. (2021). Passive sampling of SARS-CoV-2 for wastewater surveillance. Environmental science & technology, 55(15), 10432-10441.
Lappan, R., Henry, R., Chown, S. L., Luby, S. P., Higginson, E. E., Bata, L., ... & McCarthy, D. (2021). Monitoring of diverse enteric pathogens across environmental and host reservoirs with TaqMan array cards and standard qPCR: a methodological comparison study. The Lancet Planetary Health, 5(5), e297-e308.
Li, J., Verhagen, R., Ahmed, W., Metcalfe, S., Thai, P. K., Kaserzon, S. L., ... & Mccarthy, D. (2022). In situ calibration of passive samplers for viruses in wastewater. ACS ES&T Water.
Catsamas, S., Shi, B., Deletic, B., Wang, M., & McCarthy, D. T. (2022). A Low-Cost, Low-Power Water Velocity Sensor Utilizing Acoustic Doppler Measurement. Sensors, 22(19), 7451.
Murni, I. K., Oktaria, V., Handley, A., McCarthy, D. T., Donato, C. M., Nuryastuti, T., ... & Bines, J. E. (2022). The feasibility of SARS-CoV-2 surveillance using wastewater and environmental sampling in Indonesia. PLoS One, 17(10), e0274793.
Lim, T. J., Sargent, R., Henry, R., Fletcher, T. D., Coleman, R. A., McCarthy, D. T., & Lintern, A. (2022). Riparian buffers: Disrupting the transport of E. coli from rural catchments to streams. Water Research, 222, 118897.
Fowdar, H. S., Neo, T. H., Ong, S. L., Hu, J., & McCarthy, D. T. (2022). Performance analysis of a stormwater green infrastructure model for flow and water quality predictions. Journal of Environmental Management, 316, 115259.
Galbraith, P., Henry, R., & McCarthy, D. T. (2022). Plants against pathogens: Effect of significant antimicrobial-producing plants on faecal microbe inactivation throughout the soil profile of stormwater biofilters. Water Research, 118707.
Shi, B., Catsamas, S., Deletic, B., Wang, M., Bach, P. M., Lintern, A., ... & McCarthy, D. T. (2022). Illicit discharge detection in stormwater drains using an Arduino-based low-cost sensor network. Water Science and Technology, 85(5), 1372-1383.

References 

Living people
Academic staff of Monash University
1981 births
Australian civil engineers
Monash University alumni